Hans-Rudolf Merz (born 10 November 1942) is a Swiss politician who served as a Member of the Swiss Federal Council from 2004 to 2010. A member of the Free Democratic Party (FDP/PRD) until the foundation of FDP.The Liberals in 2009, he headed the Federal Department of Finance during his tenure as a Federal Councillor. Merz served as President of the Swiss Confederation in 2009.

Biography

Education
Born in Herisau in the canton of Appenzell Ausserrhoden, he studied at Hochschule St. Gallen and graduated in 1971 with a DEA's degree. Merz was a Scout and visited the National Jamboree of Switzerland in July 2008. He is married and a father of three sons.

Early political career
From 1969 to 1974, he was party secretary of the Free Democratic Party (FDP/PRD) in St. Gallen. From 1974 to 1977 he worked as vice president for UBS's Wolfsberg formation centre in Ermatingen. Since then he has worked as a management consultant. In 1997 he was elected to the Swiss Council of States for the canton of Appenzell Ausserrhoden. He presided over the finance committee and was a member of the foreign policy committee.

Swiss Federal Council
Merz was elected to the Swiss Federal Council on 10 December 2003 and took office on 1 January 2004. At the time he was on the board of directors of the Helvetia-Patria insurance company and Anova Holding. He was also a member of the board of trustees of the Max Schmidheiny Foundation.

On 20 September 2008, whilst in Eastern Switzerland, Merz was rushed to hospital, having suffered from a heart attack. He was soon flown to Bern University Hospital, where he had a multiple bypass operation. He was also placed into an artificial coma. This led to a reorganisation of the cabinet and the absence of President Pascal Couchepin from the United Nations General Assembly in New York City. On 10 December 2008, as the Member of the Federal Council that had not been its president for the longest time, Merz was elected President of the Confederation for 2009. In the Federal Assembly, the 66-year-old received 185 out of 209 valid votes. He succeeded Free Democratic Party colleague Pascal Couchepin. Doris Leuthard was elected as Vice President of the Confederation, succeeding Merz.

On 20 September 2010, a recording of Merz replying to a question about meat imports in the Federal Assembly became a viral video, drawing international attention. Merz convulsed with laughter when reading the dense bureaucratic language of the reply drafted for him by customs officials. He was supposed to provide information if the sales of notably Bündnerfleisch in Switzerland is endangered by meat imports.

Works
Merz, Hans-Rudolf: Finanz- und Verwaltungsvermögen in öffentlich-rechtlicher und wirtschaftlicher Betrachtungsweise, unter besonderer Berücksichtigung der Staatsrechnungen der Kantone., St. Gallen 1971
Merz, Hans-Rudolf: Die aussergewöhnliche Führungspersönlichkeit: Essay über Elativität und elative Persönlichkeit., Grüsch 1987. 
Merz, Hans-Rudolf: Der Landammann und weitere Erzählungen aus dem Appenzellerland, Herisau 1992.

References

External links

|-

|-

|-

1942 births
Living people
FDP.The Liberals politicians
Members of the Federal Council (Switzerland)
Finance ministers of Switzerland
People from Appenzell Ausserrhoden
Scouting and Guiding in Switzerland
Swiss Protestants
University of St. Gallen alumni